Taxi for Two is a 1929 part talkie British romantic comedy film drama directed by Denison Clift and Alexander Esway and starring Mabel Poulton and John Stuart. Produced by Gainsborough Pictures, it was the first sound film made by Gainsborough to be released.

This film also marked Poulton's first speaking role. The film revealed Poulton to have a strident voice with a strong Cockney accent, quite at odds with the fey, winsome persona she had cultivated in her silent film appearances. She would become a notable casualty of the advent of talkies, as offers of screen work quickly dried up once her unappealing tones were revealed.

Plot
Working-class girl Molly (Poulton) finds a necklace and hands it in to the police.  It turns out that the necklace is an extremely valuable piece belonging to Lady Devenish (Grace Lane), who is impressed by Molly's honesty and invites her to her home to present her with a substantial cash reward.  Molly informs Lady Devenish that she has always longed to own her own taxi and plans to use the money to start up in the business.  Unknown to Molly, the conversation has been watched and heard by Lady Devenish's son Jack (Stuart), who finds Molly extremely attractive.  Posing as a chauffeur, he applies to be the driver of Molly's first taxi.  She agrees to employ him and the pair gradually become romantically involved.  Jack finally confesses his real identity, and the couple make plans to marry.

Cast
 Mabel Poulton as Molly
 John Stuart as Jack Devenish
 Gordon Harker as Albert
 Anne Grey as Charlotte
 Grace Lane as Lady Devenish
 Renee Clama as Gladys
 Claude Maxted as The Baron

References

External links 
 
 

1929 films
1929 romantic comedy films
British romantic comedy films
British black-and-white films
Gainsborough Pictures films
Films with screenplays by Ian Dalrymple
Films directed by Denison Clift
1920s English-language films
1920s British films